The genus Quercus contains about 500 known species, plus about 180 hybrids between them. The genus, as is the case with many large genera, is divided into subgenera and sections. Traditionally, the genus Quercus was divided into the two subgenera Cyclobalanopsis, the ring-cupped oaks, and Quercus, which included all the other sections. However, a comprehensive revision in 2017 identified different relationships. Now the genus is commonly divided into a subgenus Quercus and a subgenus Cerris, with Cyclobalanopsis included in the latter. The sections of subgenus Quercus are mostly native to the New World, with the notable exception of the white oaks of sect. Quercus and the endemic Quercus pontica. In contrast, the sections of the subgenus Cerris are exclusively native to the Old World.

Unless otherwise indicated, the lists which follow contain all the species accepted by Plants of the World Online , plus selected hybrids that are also accepted, with placement into sections based on a list produced by Denk et al. for their 2017 classification of the genus.

Legend
Species with evergreen foliage ("live oaks") are tagged '#'. Species in the genus have been recategorized between deciduous and evergreen on numerous occasions, although this does not necessarily mean that species in the two groups are closely related.

Subgenus Quercus

Section Quercus 

Section Mesobalanus was included in section Quercus in the 2017 classification used here. Other synonyms include Q. sect. Albae and Q. sect. Macrocarpae. The section comprises the white oaks from Europe, Asia, north Africa, Central and North America. Styles short; acorns mature in 6 months, sweet or slightly bitter, inside of acorn shell hairless.

Quercus aculcingensis Trel. – Mexico
Quercus ajoensis C.H.Mull. – Ajo Mountain shrub oak, Blue shrub oak – Arizona, New Mexico, Baja California
Quercus alba L. – white oak – eastern and central North America
Quercus aliena Blume – Oriental white oak – eastern Asia
Quercus alpescens Trel. – Mexico
Quercus ariifolia Trel. – Mexico
Quercus arizonica Sarg. – Arizona white oak – # southwestern U.S., northwestern Mexico
Quercus austrina Small – bluff oak – southeastern North America
Quercus × basaseachicensis C.H.Mull. – Mexico
Quercus × bebbiana C.K.Schneid. — Bebb's oak — northeastern North America
Quercus berberidifolia Liebm. – California shrub oak – # California
Quercus bicolor Willd. – swamp white oak – eastern and midwestern North America
Quercus × bimundorum E.J.Palmer — two worlds oak
Quercus boyntonii Beadle – Boynton's post oak – south central North America
Quercus canariensis Willd. – Mirbeck's oak or Algerian oak – # North Africa & Spain
Quercus carmenensis C.H.Mull. – Carmen oak – Coahuila and Texas
Quercus × cerrioides Willk. & Costa – east Spain
Quercus chapmanii Sarg. – Chapman oak – # southeastern North America
Quercus chartacea Trel. – Mexico
Quercus chihuahuensis Trel. – Chihuahua oak – northern Mexico and Texas
Quercus congesta C.Presl – Italy
Quercus convallata Trel. – Mexico
Quercus copeyensis C.H.Mull. – # Costa Rica, Panama
Quercus cornelius-mulleri Nixon & K.P.Steele – Muller oak – # southwestern North America
Quercus corrugata Hook. – Mexico, Central America
Quercus dalechampii Ten. – southeastern Europe
Quercus deliquescens C.H.Mull. – Mexico
Quercus dentata Thunb. – daimyo oak – eastern Asia
Quercus depressipes Trel. – Davis Mountain oak – northern Mexico and Texas
Quercus deserticola Trel. – # Mexico
Quercus diversifolia Née – Mexico
Quercus douglasii Hook. & Arn. – blue oak – California
Quercus dumosa Nutt. – coastal shrub oak – # southern California, Baja California, Arizona
Quercus durata Jeps. – leather oak – # California
Quercus edwardsiae C.H.Mull. – Mexico
Quercus engelmannii Greene – Engelmann oak – # southern California, Baja California
Quercus estremadurensis O.Schwarz – Portugal, Spain, Morocco
Quercus fabrei Hance – Faber's oak – central to southern China
Quercus faginea Lam. – Portuguese oak – # southwestern Europe
Quercus frainetto Ten. — Hungarian oak or Italian oak — southeastern Europe
Quercus frutex Trel. – Mexico
†Quercus furuhjelmi — Eocene to Miocene - Alaska, Kazhakstan 
Quercus gambelii Nutt. – Gambel oak – southwestern North America
Quercus garryana Douglas ex Hook. – Oregon white oak or Garry oak – western North America
Quercus germana Schltdl. & Cham. – Mexico
Quercus glabrescens Benth. – Mexico
Quercus glaucescens Bonpl. – encino blanco – Mexico
Quercus glaucoides M.Martens & Galeotti – # Mexico
Quercus greggii (A.DC.) Trel. – # Mexico
Quercus griffithii Hook.f. & Thomson ex Miq. – southeast Asia
Quercus grisea Liebm. – gray oak – # southwestern North America
Quercus hartwissiana Steven – Strandzha oak – southeastern Bulgaria, northern Turkey, western Georgia, southwestern Russia
Quercus havardii Rydb. – Havard oak, shinnery oak, shin oak – south central North America
†Quercus hiholensis — Miocene — # Washington State
Quercus hinckleyi C.H.Mull. – Hinckley oak – # Texas, northwestern Mexico
Quercus infectoria G.Olivier – Aleppo oak, Cyprus oak – southern Europe, southwestern Asia
Quercus insignis M.Martens & Galeotti – Mexico, Belize, Costa Rica, Guatemala, Panama
Quercus intricata Trel. – Coahuila scrub oak – # two isolated localities in west Texas, northern Mexico
Quercus invaginata Trel. – Mexico
Quercus john-tuckeri Nixon & C.H.Mull. – Tucker's oak – California
Quercus juergensenii Liebm. – Mexico
Quercus kotschyana O.Schwarz – Lebanon
Quercus laceyi Small – lacey oak –  Edwards Plateau of Texas, northern Mexico
Quercus laeta Liebm. – Mexico
Quercus lancifolia Schltdl. & Cham. – southwestern North America, Mexico, South America
Quercus liebmannii Oerst. ex Trel. — Mexico
Quercus lobata Née – valley oak or California white oak – California
Quercus lusitanica Lam. – gall oak or Lusitanian oak – Iberia, North Africa
Quercus lyrata Walter – overcup oak – eastern North America
Quercus × macdonaldii Greene & Kellogg – California
Quercus macdougallii Martínez – Mexico
Quercus macranthera Fisch. & C.A.Mey. ex Hohen. – Caucasian oak or Persian oak – western Asia
Quercus macrocarpa Michx. – bur oak – eastern and central North America
Quercus magnoliifolia Née – Mexico
Quercus manzanillana Trel. – Mexico
Quercus margarettae (also Q. margaretiae and Q. margarettiae) — sand post oak — southeastern North America
Quercus martinezii C.H.Mull. – # Mexico
Quercus michauxii Nutt. – swamp chestnut oak – eastern North America
Quercus microphylla Née – Mexico
Quercus mohriana Buckley ex Rydb. – Mohr oak – # southwestern North America
Quercus mongolica Fisch. ex Ledeb. – Mongolian oak – eastern Asia
Quercus monnula Y.C.Hsu & H.Wei Jen – south-central China 
Quercus montana Willd. – chestnut oak – eastern North America (= Quercus prinus)
Quercus muehlenbergii Engelm. – Chinkapin oak – eastern, central, and southwestern US (West Texas and New Mexico), northern Mexico
Quercus ningqiangensis S.Z.Qu & W.H.Zhang – southeastern China
Quercus oblongifolia Torr. – Arizona blue oak, Southwestern blue oak, or Mexican blue oak  – # southwestern U.S., northwestern Mexico
Quercus obtusata Bonpl. – Mexico
Quercus oglethorpensis W.H.Duncan – Oglethorpe oak – southeastern North America
Quercus oocarpa Liebm. – Mexico
Quercus opaca Trel. – Mexico
Quercus pacifica Nixon & C.H.Mull. – # Channel Islands, California
Quercus parvula Greene – Shreve oak, Santa Cruz Island oak – # coastal California
Quercus peduncularis Née – # Central America
Quercus perpallida Trel. – Mexico
Quercus petraea (Matt.) Liebl. – sessile oak, durmast oak – Europe, Anatolia
Quercus polymorpha Schltdl. & Cham. – Monterrey oak, Mexican white oak – # Mexico and extreme S. Texas
Quercus porphyrogenita Trel. – Mexico
Quercus potosina Trel. – Mexico
Quercus praeco Trel. – Mexico
Quercus pringlei Seemen ex Loes. – Mexico
Quercus prinoides Willd. – dwarf chinkapin oak – eastern North America
Quercus pubescens Willd. – downy oak – Europe, Anatolia
Quercus pungens Liebm. – sandpaper oak or pungens oak – southwestern U.S., Mexico
Quercus purulhana Trel. – Mexico, Central America
Quercus pyrenaica Willd. – Pyrenean oak – southwestern Europe
Quercus rekonis Trel. – Mexico
Quercus repanda Bonpl. – Mexico
Quercus resinosa Liebm. – Mexico
Quercus robur L. – pedunculate oak, English oak or French oak  – Europe, West Asia
Quercus rugosa Née – netleaf oak or Rugosa oak – # southwestern U.S., northwestern Mexico
Quercus × schuettei Trel. — Schuette's oak — US, Canada
Quercus sebifera Trel. – # Mexico
Quercus segoviensis Liebm. – Mexico and northern Central America
Quercus serrata Murray – bao li – # China, Taiwan, Japan, Korea
Quercus shennongii C.C.Huang & S.H.Fu – southeastern China
Quercus shingjenensis Y.T.Chang – China (Guizhou)
Quercus similis Ashe – swamp post oak – southeastern North America
Quercus sinuata Walter – bastard oak – southern North America (formerly identified as Quercus durandii)
Quercus sororia Liebm. – Mexico
Quercus stellata Wangenh. – post oak – eastern North America
Quercus striatula Trel. – Mexico (Sierra Madre Occidental and Mexican Plateau ranges)
Quercus subspathulata Trel. – Mexico
Quercus supranitida C.H.Mull. – Mexico
Quercus tinkhamii C.H.Mull. — Mexico
Quercus toumeyi Sarg. — Toumey oak — # southwest New Mexico, southeastern Arizona, northern Mexico
Quercus tuberculata Liebm. — Mexico
Quercus turbinella Greene — turbinella oak, Arizona Blue Shrub oak, Shrub live oak or scrub live oak — # southwestern North America
Quercus vaseyana Buckley — Vasey oak — # southwestern North America
Quercus verde C.H.Mull. — Mexico
Quercus vicentensis Trel. — El Salvador, Guatemala, and southern Mexico
Quercus vulcanica Boiss. & Heldr. ex Kotschy — Kasnak oak — southwestern Asia
Quercus welshii R.A.Denham — havard oak, Utah sand oak, wavy leaf oak — # southwestern North America
Quercus wutaishanica Mayr — Liaoning oak — China, Mongolia
Quercus xylina Scheidw. — Mexico

Section Ponticae 

Species are native to Western Asia and Western North America. They produce catkins up to 10cm long; the acorns mature annually.

 Quercus pontica — Pontine oak — western Asia
 Quercus sadleriana — deer oak — # southwestern Oregon, northern California

Section Protobalanus 

The intermediate oaks. Southwest USA and northwest Mexico. Styles short, acorns mature in 18 months, very bitter, inside of acorn shell woolly.

 Quercus cedrosensis — Cedros Island oak — # California + Baja California
 Quercus chrysolepis — canyon live oak — # southwestern North America
 Quercus palmeri — Palmer oak — # California, western Arizona
 Quercus tomentella — island oak — # offshore islands of California + Baja California
 Quercus vacciniifolia — huckleberry oak — # southwestern North America

Section Lobatae 

The red oaks (synonym sect. Erythrobalanus), native to North, Central and South America. Styles long, acorns mature in 18 months (in most species), very bitter, inside of acorn shell woolly.

Quercus acatenangensis Trel. – Mexico, Guatemala, El Salvador
Quercus acerifolia (E.J.Palmer) Stoynoff & W.J.Hess ex R.J.Jensen – maple-leaved oak or mapleleaf oak – Arkansas
Quercus acherdophylla Trel. – # Mexico
Quercus acutangula Trel. – Mexico
Quercus acutifolia, syn. Quercus conspersa — Mexico
Quercus aerea Trel. — Mexico
Quercus affinis Scheidw. – # Mexico
Quercus agrifolia Née – coast live oak – # California, northern Baja California
Quercus albocincta Trel. – Mexico (Sierra Madre Occidental)
Quercus aristata Hook. & Arn. – Mexico
Quercus arkansana Sarg. – Arkansas oak – southeastern North America
Quercus benthamii A.DC. – # southern Mexico and Central America
Quercus brenesii Trel. – Costa Rica, Mexico
Quercus buckleyi Nixon & Dorr – Texas red oak – south central North America
Quercus calophylla Schltdl. & Cham. — Mexico
Quercus canbyi Trel. (syn. Quercus graciliformis) – Canby oak or Mexican red oak – # Texas, Mexico
Quercus castanea Née – # Mexico
Quercus charcasana Trel. ex A.Camus – Mexico
Quercus chimaltenangana Trel. – Guatemala
Quercus coahuilensis Nixon & C.H.Mull. – Mexico
Quercus coccinea Münchh. – scarlet oak – eastern North America
Quercus coffeicolor Trel. – Mexico
Quercus confertifolia Bonpl. (syn. Quercus gentryi) — Mexico
Quercus conzattii Trel. – Mexico 
Quercus cortesii Liebm. – # southern Mexico and Central America
Quercus costaricensis Liebm. – # Costa Rica, Panama
Quercus crassifolia Bonpl. – Mexico
Quercus crassipes Bonpl. – Mexico
Quercus crispifolia Trel. — Mexico
Quercus crispipilis Trel. – Mexico, Guatemala
Quercus cualensis L.M.González – # Mexico (Sierra Madre del Sur)
Quercus delgadoana S.Valencia, Nixon & L.M.Kelly – Mexico
Quercus depressa Bonpl. – Mexico
Quercus devia Goldman – Mexico (Baja California Peninsula)
Quercus durifolia Seemen ex Loes. – Mexico (Sierra Madre Occidental)
Quercus × dysophylla — Mexico
Quercus eduardi Trel. — Mexico
Quercus ellipsoidalis E.J.Hill – northern pin oak – eastern North America
Quercus elliptica Née – Mexico
Quercus emoryi Torr. – Emory oak – # southwestern U.S., northern Mexico
Quercus falcata Michx. – southern red oak or Spanish oak – southeastern North America
Quercus floccosa Liebm. – Mexico
Quercus flocculenta C.H.Mull. — Mexico
Quercus fulva Liebm. – Mexico
Quercus furfuracea Liebm. – Mexico
Quercus galeanensis C.H.Mull. – Mexico
Quercus georgiana M.A.Curtis – Georgia oak – southeastern North America
Quercus gracilior C.H.Mull. – Honduras
Quercus grahamii Benth. – Mexico
Quercus gravesii Sudw. – Chisos red oak or Graves oak – Mexico, southwestern North America (Texas)
Quercus gulielmi-treleasei C.H.Mull. – Costa Rica to western Panama
Quercus hemisphaerica W.Bartram ex Willd. – laurel oak or Darlington oak – # southeastern North America
Quercus hintonii E.F.Warb. – Mexico
Quercus hintoniorum Nixon & C.H.Mull. – # Mexico
Quercus hirtifolia M.L.Vázquez, S.Valencia & Nixon – # Mexico
Quercus humboldtii Bonpl. – Andean oak – # northern South America (Colombia & Panama)
Quercus hypoleucoides A.Camus – silverleaf oak – # southwestern North America
Quercus hypoxantha Trel. – # Mexico
Quercus ignaciensis C.H.Mull. – Sonora
Quercus ilicifolia Wangenh. – bear oak – eastern North America
Quercus iltisii L.M.González – western Mexico
Quercus imbricaria Michx. – shingle oak – eastern North America
Quercus incana W.Bartram – bluejack oak – southeastern North America
Quercus inopina Ashe – sandhill oak – Florida
Quercus jonesii Trel. – northern Mexico
Quercus kelloggii Newb. – California black oak – California, southwestern Oregon
Quercus laevis Walter – turkey oak – southeastern North America
Quercus laurifolia Michx. – laurel oak – # southeastern North America
Quercus laurina Bonpl. – # Mexico
Quercus marilandica (L.) Münchh. – blackjack oak – eastern North America
Quercus mcvaughii Spellenb. (orth. var. Q. macvaughii) — Mexico (northern and central Sierra Madre Occidental)
Quercus mexicana Bonpl. – Mexico
Quercus miquihuanensis Nixon & C.H.Mull. – Mexico (Sierra Madre Oriental)
Quercus mulleri Martínez – Mexico
Quercus myrtifolia Willd. – myrtle oak – # southeastern North America
Quercus nigra L. – water oak – # eastern North America
Quercus nixoniana S.Valencia & Lozada-Pérez – Mexico
Quercus pagoda Raf. – cherrybark oak – southeastern North America
Quercus palustris Münchh. – pin oak – eastern North America
Quercus panamandinaea C.H.Mull. – Panama
Quercus paxtalensis C.H.Mull. – Mexico
Quercus peninsularis Trel. – Mexico (Baja California)
Quercus pennivenia Trel. – Mexico
Quercus phellos L. – willow oak – eastern North America
Quercus pinnativenulosa C.H.Mull. – Mexico
Quercus planipocula Trel. – western Mexico
Quercus pumila Walter – runner oak – # southeastern North America
Quercus radiata Trel. – Mexico (southern Sierra Madre Occidental)
Quercus robusta C.H.Mull. – Chisos Mountains of Texas
Quercus rubra L. – northern red oak – eastern North America
Quercus rubramenta Trel. – Mexico
Quercus runcinatifolia Trel. & C.H.Mull. – Mexico
Quercus rysophylla Weath. – loquat-leaf oak – # Mexico
Quercus salicifolia Née – # Mexico
Quercus saltillensis Trel. — Mexico
Quercus sapotifolia Liebm. – # southern Mexico, Central America
Quercus sartorii Liebm. – Mexico
Quercus scytophylla Liebm. — Mexico
Quercus seemannii Liebm. – southeastern Mexico and Central America 
Quercus shumardii Buckley – Shumard oak – eastern North America
Quercus sideroxyla Bonpl. – Mexico
Quercus skinneri Benth. – Mexico (Chiapas, Oaxaca, Tamaulipas, Veracruz) Guatemala, El Salvador, Honduras
Quercus tarahumara Spellenb., J.D.Bacon & Breedlove – Mexico
Quercus tardifolia C.H.Mull. – lateleaf oak – # two small clumps in Chisos Mountains of Texas
Quercus texana Buckley – Nuttall's oak – south central North America (Lower Mississippi River Valley)
Quercus tonduzii Seemen – Costa Rica
Quercus tuitensis L.M.González — Mexico
Quercus urbani Trel. – Mexico
Quercus uxoris McVaugh – Mexico
Quercus velutina Lam. – black oak or eastern black oak or dyer's oak – eastern North America
Quercus viminea Trel. – # Mexico
Quercus wislizeni A.DC. – interior live oak – # California
Quercus xalapensis Bonpl. – Mexico, Central America

Section Virentes 

Section Virentes has also been treated at lower ranks. Species are native south-eastern Northern America, Mexico, the West Indies (Cuba), and Central America. A 2017 classification included seven species:

Quercus brandegeei Goldman – Brandegee oak- Baja California Sur
Quercus fusiformis Small – Texas live oak or plateau live oak – # south central North America
Quercus geminata Small – sand live oak – # southeastern United States
Quercus minima (Sarg.) Small – dwarf live oak – # southeastern North America
Quercus oleoides Schltdl. & Cham. – # from Costa Rica into Mexico
Quercus sagrana (also spelt Q. sagraeana) – Cuban oak – # western Cuba
Quercus virginiana Mill. – southern live oak – # southeastern North America

Subgenus Cerris

Section Cerris 

Species are native to Europe, north Africa and Asia. Styles long; acorns mature in 18 months, very bitter, inside of acorn shell hairless or slightly hairy.

Quercus acutissima Carruth. – sawtooth oak – # China (including Tibet), Korea, Japan, Indochina, the Himalayas (Nepal, Bhutan, northeastern India).
Quercus afares Pomel – African oak – North Africa
Quercus brantii Lindl. – Persian oak – southwestern Asia
Quercus castaneifolia C.A.Mey. – chestnut-leaved oak – Caucasus, Iran (Persia)
Quercus cerris L. – Turkey oak – southern Europe, southwestern Asia
Quercus chenii Nakai – SE China
Quercus × crenata Lam. – Spanish oak – France, mainland Italy, Sicily, former Yugoslavia 
Quercus ithaburensis Decne. – Mount Tabor's oak – southeastern Europe, southwestern Asia
Quercus ithaburensis subsp. macrolepis, syn. Quercus macrolepis — Vallonea oak — # southwestern Asia
Quercus libani G.Olivier – Lebanon oak – southwestern Asia
Quercus look Kotschy – Levant
Quercus persica Jaub. & Spach – western Iran
Quercus suber L. – cork oak – # southwestern Europe, northwestern Africa
Quercus trojana Webb – Macedonian oak – # southeastern Europe
Quercus ungeri Kotschy – northwestern Iran
Quercus variabilis Blume – Chinese cork oak – eastern Asia

Section Ilex 

Species in section Ilex are native to Eurasia and northern Africa. Styles medium-long; acorns mature in 12–24 months, appearing hairy on the inside. Evergreen leaves, with bristle-like extensions on the teeth. (Sister group to sect. Cerris and sometimes included in it.)

Quercus acrodonta Seemen — # China
Quercus alnifolia Poech — golden oak — # Cyprus
Quercus aquifolioides Rehder & E.H.Wilson — # China (including Tibet)
Quercus aucheri Jaub. & Spach – eastern Aegean Islands and southwestern Turkey
Quercus baloot Griff. – Afghanistan to western Himalayas
Quercus baronii Skan – China
Quercus coccifera L., syn. Quercus calliprinos Webb – kermes oak – # southern Europe
Quercus cocciferoides Hand.-Mazz. – south-central China
Quercus dolicholepis A.Camus – China
Quercus engleriana Seemen – Tibet and southern China
Quercus fimbriata Y.C.Hsu & H.Wei Jen – south-central China
Quercus floribunda Lindl. ex A.Camus – Moru oak – # Himalayas
Quercus franchetii Skan – China, eastern Asia
Quercus gilliana Rehder & E.H.Wilson – Tibet and China (Sichuan, Yunnan, and Gansu)
Quercus guyavifolia H.Lév. – China
Quercus handeliana A.Camus – China (Yunnan)
Quercus ilex L. – holly oak or holm oak – # southern Europe
Quercus kingiana Craib – south-Central China, Myanmar, and Thailand
Quercus kongshanensis Y.C.Hsu & H.Wei Jen – China (Sichuan)
Quercus lanata Sm. – woolly-leaved oak – # Himalayas, southeast Asia
Quercus leucotrichophora A.Camus – Banj oak, blackjack oak, grey oak – # Himalayas
Quercus lodicosa O.E.Warb. & E.F.Warb. – Assam, southeastern Tibet, northern Myanmar
Quercus longispica (Hand.-Mazz.) A.Camus – China (Yunnan and Sichuan)
Quercus marlipoensis Hu & W.C.Cheng – China (Yunnan)
Quercus monimotricha (Hand.-Mazz.) Hand.-Mazz. – south-central China and northern Myanmar
Quercus oxyphylla (E.H.Wilson) Hand.-Mazz. – China
Quercus pannosa Hand.-Mazz. # – China
Quercus phillyreoides A.Gray – Southern China, Ryukyu Islands, Japan
Quercus pseudococcifera Desf. – Iberia, Morocco, Algeria, Tunisia, Sardinia, Sicily
Quercus rehderiana Hand.-Mazz. – Tibet to China (Yunnan, Sichuan, Guizhou)
Quercus rotundifolia Lam. – ballota oak or holm oak – # Iberian peninsula, northwestern Africa
Quercus semecarpifolia Sm. – brown oak or Kharshu oak – # Himalayas
Quercus senescens Hand.-Mazz. – Eastern Himalayas, Tibet, south-central China
Quercus setulosa Hickel & A.Camus – # Laos, Vietnam
Quercus spinosa David – China, Myanmar
Quercus tarokoensis Hayata – eastern Taiwan
Quercus tungmaiensis Y.T.Chang – Arunachal Pradesh and southeastern Tibet
Quercus utilis Hu & W.C.Cheng – China (Yunnan, Guizhou, and Guangxi)
Quercus yiwuensis Y.C.Hsu & H.Wei Jen – China (Yunnan)

Section Cyclobalanopsis 

The ring-cupped oaks (synonym genus Cyclobalanopsis), native to eastern and southeastern tropical Asia. They have corns with distinctive cups bearing concrescent rings of scales. They commonly also have densely clustered acorns, though this does not apply to all of the species. About 90 species.
 Species

Quercus acuta Thunb. – Japanese evergreen oak. # Japan, Korea
Quercus albicaulis Chun & W.C.Ko – # China
Quercus annulata Sm. – # The Himalayas to Vietnam
Quercus arbutifolia Hickel & A.Camus – # Vietnam (endemic)
Quercus argentata Korth. – # Malaysia, Indonesia
Quercus argyrotricha A.Camus – # Guizhou (China)
Quercus asymmetrica Hickel & A.Camus – # China, northern Vietnam
Quercus augustinii Skan – # China, Vietnam
Quercus austrocochinchinensis Hickel & A.Camus – # China, Thailand, Vietnam
Quercus baniensis A.Camus – central Vietnam
Quercus bambusifolia Hance – China (Guangdong, Guangxi), northern Vietnam
Quercus bella Chun & Tsiang – # China
Quercus blakei Skan (syn. Q. chrysocalyx) — # China, Laos, Vietnam
Quercus blaoensis A.Camus – southeastern Vietnam
Quercus braianensis A.Camus – # Vietnam (endemic)
Quercus brandisiana Kurz – upland Indochina, Bangladesh
Quercus brevicalyx A.Camus — # China, Laos
Quercus breviradiata (W.C.Cheng) C.C.Huang – central and south-central China
Quercus cambodiensis Hickel & A.Camus – Cambodia
Quercus championii Benth. – # China, Taiwan
Quercus chevalieri Hickel & A.Camus – # China, Vietnam
Quercus chrysocalyx Hickel & A.Camus – # Vietnam
Quercus chrysotricha A.Camus – Borneo (Sarawak)
Quercus chungii F.P.Metcalf – # China
Quercus ciliaris C.C.Huang & Y.T.Chang – China (Hubei, Sichuan, Zhejiang, Anhui)
Quercus daimingshanensis (S.K.Lee) C.C.Huang – # China
Quercus dankiaensis A.Camus — # Vietnam (endemic)
Quercus delavayi Franch. – # China
Quercus delicatula Chun & Tsiang – # China
Quercus dilacerata Hickel & A.Camus – northern Vietnam
Quercus dinghuensis C.C.Huang – # China
Quercus disciformis Chun & Tsiang – # China
Quercus donnaiensis A.Camus – southeastern Vietnam
Quercus edithiae Skan – # China, Vietnam
Quercus elevaticostata (Q.F.Zheng) C.C.Huang – # Fujian (China)
Quercus elmeri Merr. – Sumatra, Borneo, Peninsular Malaysia
Quercus eumorpha Kurz – southern Myanmar
Quercus fuliginosa Chun & W.C.Ko – Hainan
Quercus gaharuensis Soepadmo – western Borneo, eastern Sumatra, Peninsular Malaysia
Quercus gambleana A.Camus – # China, India
Quercus gemelliflora Blume – # Malaysia, Indonesia, Vietnam
Quercus gilva Blume – # Japan, Taiwan, China
Quercus glauca Thunb. – ring-cupped oak – # from Afghanistan to Japan and Vietnam
Quercus gomeziana A.Camus – # Vietnam
Quercus gracilenta Chun – China (Guangdong)
Quercus helferiana A.DC. – # China, India, Burma/Myanmar, Thailand, Laos, Vietnam
Quercus hondae Makino – # Kyūshū (Japan)
Quercus hui Chun – China
Quercus hypargyrea (Seemen ex Diels) C.C.Huang & Y.T.Chang (as Q. multinervis) — # China
Quercus hypophaea Hayata – # Taiwan
Quercus jenseniana Hand.-Mazz. – # China
Quercus jinpinensis (Y.C.Hsu & H.Wei Jen) C.C.Huang – # China
Quercus kerangasensis Soepadmo – Borneo
Quercus kerrii Craib – Kerr's oak – # Vietnam, Thailand, possibly China
Quercus kinabaluensis Soepadmo – Borneo
Quercus kiukiangensis (Y.T.Chang) Y.T.Chang – # China
Quercus kouangsiensis A.Camus – # China
Quercus lamellosa Sm. – # Himalayas
Quercus langbianensis Hickel & A.Camus (syn. Q. camusiae) – # Cambodia, China, Vietnam
Quercus lenticellata Barnett – northern Thailand
Quercus liaoi C.F.Shen – Taiwan
Quercus lineata Blume – # Assam, Bangladesh, Indochina, Hainan, Malaysia, western Indonesia
Quercus litseoides Dunn – # China
Quercus lobbii Hook.f. & Thomson ex Ettingsh. – # China, India
Quercus longinux Hayata – # Taiwan
Quercus lowii King – # Borneo
Quercus lungmaiensis (Hu) C.C.Huang & Y.T.Chang – # Yunnan (China)
Quercus macrocalyx Hickel & A.Camus – # Vietnam
Quercus meihuashanensis (Q.F.Zheng) C.C.Huang – China (Fujian)
Quercus merrillii Seemen – # Sabah and Sarawak (Malaysia), Palawan (Philippines)
Quercus mespilifolia Wall. ex A.DC. – # Vietnam
Quercus miyagii (orth. var. Q. miyagei) — Ryukyu Islands
Quercus morii Hayata – # Taiwan
Quercus motuoensis C.C.Huang – # China
Quercus myrsinifolia Blume (syn. Q. neglecta) – bamboo-leaf oak – # China, Japan, Korea, Laos, Thailand, Vietnam
Quercus ningangensis (orth. var. Q. ninggangensis) — # China
Quercus nivea King – Malaysia (Peninsular Malaysia, Sarawak)
Quercus oidocarpa Korth. – Myanmar, Thailand, Vietnam, Malaysia, Indonesia (Kalimantan, Sumatra, Bangka)
Quercus oxyodon Miq. (syn. Q. songtavanensis) – # Assam, Myanmar, China, Bhutan, Nepal, northern Vietnam (synonym Q. songtavanensis)
Quercus pachyloma Seemen – # China, Taiwan
Quercus pentacycla Y.T.Chang – # China
Quercus percoriacea Soepadmo – Borneo
Quercus petelotii A.Camus – # Vietnam (endemic)
Quercus phanera Chun – # China
Quercus pinbianensis (Y.C.Hsu & H.Wei Jen) C.C.Huang & Y.T.Chang – China (Yunnan)
Quercus platycalyx Hickel & A.Camus – Vietnam
Quercus poilanei (orth. var. Q. poilanii) — # China, Thailand, Vietnam
Quercus pseudoverticillata Soepadmo – Borneo
Quercus quangtriensis Hickel & A.Camus – # Vietnam
Quercus ramsbottomii A.Camus – Myanmar, Thailand
Quercus rex Hemsl. – # China, India, Laos, Myanmar, Vietnam
Quercus rupestris Hickel & A.Camus – # Vietnam (endemic)
Quercus salicina Blume – # Japan, South Korea
Quercus saravanensis A.Camus – # China, Laos, Vietnam
Quercus schottkyana Rehder & E.H.Wilson – # China
Quercus semiserrata Roxb. – # China, Bangladesh, India, Myanmar, Thailand
Quercus semiserratoides (Y.C.Hsu & H.Wei Jen) C.C.Huang & Y.T.Chang – China (southeastern Yunnan)
Quercus sessilifolia Blume – # Japan, Taiwan, China
Quercus sichourensis (Y.C.Hsu) C.C.Huang & Y.T.Chang – # Yunnan (China)
Quercus steenisii Soepadmo – northern Sumatra
Quercus stenophylloides Hayata – # Taiwan
Quercus stewardiana A.Camus – # China
Quercus subsericea A.Camus – # Sumatra, Borneo, western Java, Malay Peninsula
Quercus sumatrana Soepadmo – # Sumatra and Borneo
Quercus thomsoniana A.DC. – Sikkim, Bhutan, northern Bangladesh
Quercus thorelii Hickel & A.Camus – # China, Laos, Vietnam
Quercus tiaoloshanica Chun & W.C.Ko – Hainan
Quercus tomentosinervis (Y.C.Hsu & H.Wei Jen) C.C.Huang – # China
Quercus treubiana Seemen – # Sumatra, Borneo
Quercus valdinervosa Soepadmo – Borneo
Quercus vestita Griff. – Assam
Quercus xanthoclada Drake – Myanmar, Laos, Vietnam
Quercus xanthotricha A.Camus – # China, Laos, Vietnam
Quercus xuanlienensis H.T.Binh, Ngoc & T.N.Bo – Vietnam
Quercus yonganensis L.K.Ling & C.C.Huang – # China

Intersectional hybrids
Quercus × turneri = Quercus ilex × Quercus robur — sect. Ilex × sect. Quercus – Turner's oak — Spain

Sources
 Ohwi, J. Flora of Japan, 1984. 
 Soepadmo, E., Julia, S., & Rusea G. Fagaceae. In Tree Flora of Sabah and Sarawak, Volume 3, 2006. Soepadmo, E., Saw, L.G. eds. Government of Malaysia, Kuala Lumpur, Malaysia.

References

External links

 
 
 

Quercus
Quercus
Quercus